"Tastes like chicken" is a declaration used when trying to describe the flavor of an unusual food. The expression has been used so often in popular culture that it has become a cliché. As a result, the phrase is also sometimes used to provide incongruous humor, by being used to describe foods or situations where it has no real relevance.

Possible explanations
As an explanation of why unusual meats would taste more like chicken than common alternatives such as beef or pork, different possibilities have been offered. One idea is that chicken is seen as having a bland taste compared to other meats because fat contributes more flavor than muscle (especially in the case of a lean cut such as a skinless chicken breast), making it a generic choice for comparison. Modern poultry, particularly mass-produced chicken and turkey, is particularly bland in taste, as animals are bred for large muscle mass that grows faster than naturally breeding fowl; trace chemicals in the meat that would give it a distinctive flavor would thus be dispersed through larger amounts of muscle with less time to accumulate, thus giving lower concentrations per ounce of meat and creating a more generic taste.

Another suggestion, made by Joe Staton of the Museum of Comparative Zoology, is that meat flavors are fixed based on the "evolutionary origin" of the animal. Specifically, he noted that certain tetrapods, particularly amphibians, reptiles and certain birds, largely taste like chicken, whereas other animals usually do not. Accordingly, birds (the most numerous form of meat by type) would (in most cases) naturally taste more like chicken than mammals. Furthermore, because dinosaurs are ancestral to birds, their meat would hypothetically have also tasted like chicken.  However, the meat of other fowl often tastes nothing like chicken; for example, pheasant meat is described as a "unique" flavor and ostrich meat is considered very similar to beef. In fact, duck is often considered a red meat. Birds of prey are reported to taste different. 

Seafood, however, would logically have a more distinctive flavor. (The extent of its divergence is not consistent; tuna was said to taste enough like chicken that a prominent tuna canner named its product Chicken of the Sea.) Also, although mammals are tetrapods, very few mammals taste like chicken, which implies that there had been a mutation that changed their flavor on that branch of the evolutionary tree.

Another possibility is that since much of the meat of a chicken is taken from the chest, which contains the white 'fast fibers' that are necessary for the short, fast flight of a fleeing chicken, it tastes like these other animals due to similar concentrations of fast fibers in the parts that are used for meat. The taste difference is usually attributed to low concentrations of the iron-containing protein myoglobin, a high concentration being more typical of vertebrates and tissues adapted for slow, sustained exertion. Myoglobin-rich meat is often called red meat.

References

Further reading

Chicken as food
Gustation
English phrases